While the Patient Slept is a 1935 comedy murder mystery film directed by Ray Enright starring Aline MacMahon as a nurse/crime sleuth and Guy Kibbee as her boyfriend and police detective. It is based on the novel of the same name written by Mignon G. Eberhart.

Plot
A comedic murder mystery involving a nurse who is assigned to the at-home care of a man who recently had a stroke. While he is unconscious, on a dark and stormy night, a murder takes place in his bedroom. With family members and potential heirs confined to the house for several days, additional murders occur while the nurse and a police detective work on solving the case.

Cast

 Aline MacMahon as Nurse Sarah Keate
 Guy Kibbee as Detective Lt. Lance O'Leary
 Lyle Talbot as Ross Lonergan
 Patricia Ellis as March Federie
 Allen Jenkins as Police Sgt. Jim Jackson
 Robert Barrat as Adolphe Federie
 Hobart Cavanaugh as Eustace Federie
 Dorothy Tree as Mittie Federie
 Henry O'Neill as Elihu Dimuck
 Russell Hicks as Dr. Jay
 Helen Flint as Isobel Federie
 Brandon Hurst as Grondal
 Eddie Shubert as Detective Muldoon
 Walter Walker as Richard Federie
 George Chandler as Evening Bulletin Reporter

Marketing
Warner Brothers marketed 12 mystery films as components of the "Clue Club", movies tied to Black Mask, a pulp magazine, aimed at increasing audiences attending WB mystery movies. There were twelve titles bearing the Warner Brothers "Clue Club" label released from 1935 to 1938.

Clue Club #1: The White Cockatoo (1935)

Clue Club #2: While the Patient Slept (1935)

Clue Club #3: The Florentine Dagger (1935)

Clue Club #4: The Case of the Curious Bride (1935)

Clue Club #5: The Case of the Lucky Legs (1935)

Clue Club #6: The Murder of Dr. Harrigan (1936)

Clue Club #7: Murder by an Aristocrat (1936)

Clue Club #8: The Case of the Velvet Claws (1936)

Clue Club #9: The Case of the Black Cat (1936)

Clue Club #10: The Case of the Stuttering Bishop (1937)

Clue Club #11: The Patient in Room 18 (1938)

Clue Club #12: Mystery House (1938)

Reception
The New York Times reviewer was unimpressed: "Mr. Kibbie and Miss MacMahon finally break the case ... but the solution is not altogether satisfactory. Neither, for that matter, is the picture. Come right down to it, it's quite unsatisfactory". Later critics also had reservations about the film, as being a lesser version of the prize-winning book: "Unfortunately, the film producers, modeling the Eberhart mystery film versions on others of the day, sought to extend humorous quips between characters and eliminate significant elements of the plot that involved clues, no doubt in hopes of attracting a broader audience".

References

External links
 
 
 
 

American comedy mystery films
American black-and-white films
Films based on American novels
Films directed by Ray Enright
1930s comedy mystery films
Warner Bros. films
1935 comedy films
1935 mystery films
1935 films
1930s English-language films
1930s American films
Films scored by Bernhard Kaun
Films about nurses